Kilpatrick's deer mouse (Peromyscus kilpatricki) is a small species of rodent in the family Cricetidae, native to mountainous regions of Michoacán, Mexico. It is found in the Trans-Mexican Volcanic Belt pine–oak forests in mesic forest habitats dominated by pine and oak at elevations above 1,600 meters. The species can be found in micro-habitats associated with rocky outcrops and fallen trees. The species is named after Dr. C. William Kilpatrick, curator of vertebrates at the University of Vermont Natural History Museum. The holotype of this species is part of the Natural Science Research Laboratory collections at the Museum of Texas Tech University.

References 

Peromyscus
Mammals described in 2017